Chef's Table is an American documentary series created by David Gelb which premiered on video streaming service Netflix on April 26, 2015. The series takes viewers inside both the lives and kitchens of a variety of acclaimed and successful international chefs, with each episode placing the spotlight on a single chef and exploring the unique lives, talents and passions which influence their style of cooking. The series has been nominated for and awarded a variety of awards, including 8 Emmy nominations, and was renewed for a seventh and eighth season on May 20, 2019.

Background
Each episode of the series focuses on a specific chef, and explores their personal philosophies and approach to cooking. Creator David Gelb considers it a follow-up to his documentary Jiro Dreams of Sushi. Both documentaries make use of cinematography and production techniques based on traditional filmmaking rather than reality television.

Episodes

Volume 1 (2015)

Volume 2 (2016)

Chef's Table: France (2016)

Volume 3 (2017)

Chef's Table: Pastry (2018)

Volume 5 (2018)

Volume 6 (2019)

Chef's Table: BBQ (2020)
A second spin-off, titled Chef's Table: BBQ premiered on September 2, 2020.

Chef's Table: Pizza (2022)

Reception
The series has been well received since it aired in 2015 and has been praised for its cinematography, score, and production.

Chef's Table has been parodied numerous times. Gods of Food, which satirizes Chef's Table and the restaurant industry, was produced by the YouTube comedy channel CollegeHumor. The IFC series Portlandia parodied the series in an episode about an airport sushi chef.

Awards

References

External links
 
 

2010s American documentary television series
2015 American television series debuts
English-language Netflix original programming
Food and drink television series
Netflix original documentary television series
Television series by Boardwalk Pictures